Abbasabad (also Romanized as ‘Abbāsābād; also known as Abbas Abad Kharaghan Sharghi) is a village in Abgarm Rural District, Abgarm District, Avaj County, Qazvin Province, Iran. At the 2006 census, its population was 218, in 58 families.

References 

Populated places in Avaj County